Snowsnaps is a Canadian CGI–animated television series. It is a preschool-aimed spinoff of the 2015 film Snowtime! (La Guerre des Tuques 3D), itself an animated remake of the 1984 live-action The Dog Who Stopped the War (La Guerre des Tuques) movie. Produced by Carpediem Film & TV in collaboration with the animation studio Singing Frog and broadcaster Corus Entertainment, the series premiered September 1, 2018 in Canada on Télétoon, La Chaîne Disney and Treehouse TV.

Plot 
For Violet, Tomas, Sami and Kiki, every aspect of life is all about fun and games! There is nothing they like more than playing outside, especially in the snow on a winter’s day. At the ripe age of six, no task is too small to turn it into a game, no feat is off-limits to try as they seamlessly jump into role-playing to follow their wild imagination! Come meet these four friends who love to laugh and have fun!

Characters

Violet (voiced by Satine Scarlett Montaz) – Violet is the game master. She is a free thinker who refuses to follow the herd, has tons of wit and tenacity, and a tendency to be self-indulgent – a little Scoundrel. Her games and her behaviour are never mean or cruel, but if she gets into trouble it is due more to her youthful enthusiasm than any malicious intent. She is easily distracted by the sparkles or whatever is pink!
Tomas (voiced by Brandon Lising) – Tomas is open-faced and controlled by his heart of gold. Like all Innocents, he is generous and open-minded. He sees both sides of any disagreement. A natural peacemaker with an intense sense of fairness, he cannot stand conflict. Terry the penguin is his favourite toy, what's yours?
Sami (voiced by Kimia Esfahani) – Sami is a smarty pants know-it-all who actually doesn’t know it all, but he is still full of voluble explanations – the weirder and more unpredictable the better. He’s likely to say or do anything; he loves playing the Fool. His favourite treats are Brussels sprouts and broccoli!
Kiki (voiced by Ella Rose Coderre) – Kiki is a daredevil. She’s all about movement and physicality. When in doubt, she acts; thinking is for after. She is compelled to triumph even if she does not have the skills. She’ll keep on trying until she can make it happen. A soldier who’ll take on any mission! One thing is certain, we can always count on Kiki to play!

Cast 
Adapted from the ending credits.

 Satine Scarlett Montaz / Marguerite D'Amours as Violet
 Kimia Esfahani / Catherine Brunet as Sami
 Ella Rose Coderre / Claudia-Laurie Corbeil as Kiki
 Brandon Lising / Valérie Gagné as Tomas
Voice director(s): Richard M. Dumont / Johanne Garneau, Julie Burroughs

Production

A preschool-oriented spinoff of Snowtime! was announced to be in development in November 2015. Snowsnaps was officially unveiled during the 2016 Cartoon Forum in Toulouse, France as the first-ever Canadian submission. The series is distributed as either 26 eleven-minute episodes or 52 five-minute shorts.

For the musical "Shortsnaps" segments, the production crew held open auditions for bilingual singers across Canada in July 2017.

Episodes

Series overview

Season 1 (2018)

 The episodes "1-2-3, Cupcake!", "The Monster", "The Maze", "Knighthood", "What's Your Treasure?", "Winter Games", "Kids vs. Aliens", and "Sami's Pet" were all adapted into books.

Shortsnaps segment 
For the musical Shortsnaps segment, the production crew had held open auditions for bilingual singers across Canada in July 2017.

 Lyrics, music, and songs by Eloi Painchaud and Jorane.
 Songs sung by Cool Kids

These are the songs used throughout episodes of the show. There are six of them, which are repeated throughout reruns on Treehouse TV. They are directed by Claude Precourt, Robert Yates and Vanessa Isabelle and choreographed by Louis-Martin Charest.

International broadcast
The show originally aired from September 1 to November 25, 2018. The show was moved to two new time slots when it is aired in reruns on Treehouse TV, which is weekday mornings at 8:40 AM and Friday afternoons at 3:02 PM. The show will also be broadcast later internationally.

Canada
Treehouse TV (September 1, 2018 – 2020)
Disney Junior sur La Chaîne Disney (September 1, 2018 – August 25, 2019; May 2020 – present)
Télétoon (September 1, 2018 – August 25, 2019)

France
Piwi+ (December 1, 2018 – present)
Germany
KiKa (December 25, 2018 – present)

United States
Disney Junior (November 28, 2020)

United Kingdom
Sky Kids (January 15, 2021 – present)

Spain
Super3 (2021–present)

References

External links
 Les Mini-Tuques at Disney La Chaîne
 Snowsnaps, official website 

2010s Canadian animated television series
2018 Canadian television series debuts
2018 Canadian television series endings
Canadian animated television spin-offs
Canadian children's animated adventure television series
Canadian children's animated comedy television series
Canadian computer-animated television series
Canadian preschool education television series
Animated preschool education television series
2010s preschool education television series
English-language television shows
Teletoon original programming
Treehouse TV original programming
Animated television series about children